In enzymology, a lactate—malate transhydrogenase is an enzyme that catalyzes the chemical reaction

(S)-lactate + oxaloacetate  pyruvate + malate

Thus, the two substrates of this enzyme are (S)-lactate and oxaloacetate, whereas its two products are pyruvate and malate.

This enzyme belongs to the family of oxidoreductases, specifically those acting on the CH-OH group of donor with other acceptors.  The systematic name of this enzyme class is (S)-lactate:oxaloacetate oxidoreductase. This enzyme is also called malate-lactate transhydrogenase.  This enzyme participates in pyruvate metabolism.  It employs one cofactor, nicotinamide D-ribonucleotide.

References

Further reading 

 
 

EC 1.1.99
Enzymes of unknown structure